José Rafael de Gallegos y Alvarado (31 October 1784, Cesantes, Spain – 14 August 1850) was president of Costa Rica's Junta Superior Gubernativa from October 1822 to January 1823 and head of state of Costa Rica from March 1833 until March 1835 and again from May 1845 to June 1846.

José Rafael Gallegos was born in Cesantes, Redondela in Galician Spain but moved with his parents to Cartago, Costa Rica at the age of 8 where his parents settled to farm and raise cattle. A widower before marrying Ignacia Sáenz y Ulloa in 1822. He had eight children from his second marriage. He supported the Jesuits.

References

1784 births
1850 deaths
People from Redondela
People from Cartago Province
Presidents of Costa Rica
Vice presidents of Costa Rica
19th-century Costa Rican people
Costa Rican monarchists
Emigrants from Spain to New Spain